Niklas Lilja is a race driver and factory test driver at Koenigsegg Automotive AB. He set the land speed record for a production vehicle in 2017 with an average top speed of 277.87 mph (447.19 km/h) in a Koenigsegg Agera RS, as well as several related records.

References 

Living people
Year of birth missing (living people)
Swedish racing drivers
Land speed record people